Lebedev Institute of Precision Mechanics and Computer Engineering (IPMCE) is a Russian research institution. It used to be a Soviet Academy of Sciences organization in Soviet times. The institute specializes itself in the development of:

 Computer systems for national security
 Hardware and software for digital telecommunication
 Multimedia systems for control and training
 Positioning and navigational systems

In August 2009 IPMCE became a joint-stock company.

Computers developed by IPMCE 
 BESM-1
 BESM-2
 BESM-4
 BESM-6
 Elbrus-1
 Elbrus-2
 Elbrus-3

Programming, structured programming, task management, system programming developed by IPMCE 

 Эль-76

External links
 IPMCE  and IPMCE

References 

Computing in the Soviet Union
Institutes of the Russian Academy of Sciences
Research institutes in the Soviet Union
Computer science institutes
Cultural heritage monuments in Moscow